It Ain't Illegal Yet is the eighth solo studio album by American hip hop musician Del the Funky Homosapien. It was released by Funnyman Entertainment in 2010, for an unfixed rate with a minimum of $3. Special packages, including signed merchandise and chances to meet Del, were given to those who were willing to pay more for the album.

Title
The title of the album is a quote from George Clinton. In an interview with SF Station, Del said: "It's a quote from George Clinton. When he said it, he was referring to thinking. You can still make your own decisions while there is time. I think a lot of people aren't doing that right now."

Track listing

References

External links
 

2010 albums
Del the Funky Homosapien albums